Lesterud is a district in the municipality of Bærum, Norway. Its population (2007) is 3,302.

References

Villages in Akershus
Bærum